was a Japanese anime director.

Life and career
After graduating from Chuo University's Animation Resource Group, Yamaguchi pursued a career in anime directing, with his debut being the anime production  which was released August 8, 1992 by Shochiku. In 1995, he directed the OVA adaptation of the manga Level C. This story of a gay romance was originally released on July 14, 1995. Later that year, he also directed the OAV anime Galaxy Fraulein Yuna: Siren's Sadness, which was released September 21, 1995.

In 2003, Yamaguchi directed the TV series Mouse, which was based on the manga of the same name written by Satoru Akahori. The 2003 twelve-episode series followed the adventures of a young teacher with the alternate identity of the master thief "Mouse".

On April 11, 2020, Yamaguchi died at the age of 61 due to myocardial infarction from a cerebral hemorrhage.

Filmography
Little Twins: Bokura no Natsu ga Tondeiku (movie), 1992
Columbus's Great Adventures (OVA), 1993
Level C (OVA), 1995
Galaxy Fräulein Yuna: Siren's Sadness (OVA), 1995
Taro the Space Alien (TV), 2000—2001
Tantei Shounen Kageman (TV), 2001—2002
Mouse (TV), 2003
Zoids: Fuzors (TV), 2004-2005 (chief director, episode 16–26)
Grandpa Danger (TV), 2004—2005
Zoids: Genesis (TV), 2005-2006 (animation producer)

References

External links
 
 

1959 births
2020 deaths
Anime directors
Japanese film directors
Chuo University alumni